Dacampia rufescentis is a species of fungus belonging to the family Dacampiaceae.

It is native to Europe.

References

Pleosporales